Kitty O'Brien may refer to:

 Kitty O'Brien (stained glass artist) (1881–1963), Irish stained glass artist
Kitty O'Brien (engineer) (1916–1993), American electrical engineer 
Kitty Wilmer O'Brien (1910–1982), Irish painter

See also
Kitt O'Brien (born 1990), American football player
Catherine O'Brien (disambiguation)